Dioptinae is a subfamily of the moth family Notodontidae.

The Dioptinae are an almost exclusively neotropical group of day-flying moths, many of which exhibit bright wing coloration and are involved in mimicry rings with butterflies (especially Ithomiini) and moths of the subfamilies Sterrhinae and Arctiinae.

Taxonomy 
The subfamily was formerly placed in a separate family (Dioptidae). Furthermore, the tribe Josiini has been treated as a family (Josiidae) by Piepers & Snellen in 1900 and as a subfamily (Josiinae) by Kiriakoff in 1950.

Genera 
 Tribe Josiini Miller & Otero, 1994
 Caribojosia
 Ephialtias
 Getta
 Josia
 Lyces
 Notascea
 Phavaraea
 Phintia
 Polyptychia
 Proutiella
 Scea
 Tribe Dioptini Minet, 1983
 Anticoreura
 Argentala
 Brachyglene
 Cacolyces
 Chrysoglossa
 Cleptophasia
 Dioptis
 Dolophrosyne
 Erbessa
 Eremonidia
 Eremonidiopsis
 Euchontha
 Hadesina
 Isostyla
 Momonipta
 Monocreagra
 Nebulosa
 Oricia
 Pareuchontha
 Phaeochlaena
 Phanoptis
 Phryganidia
 Pikroprion
 Polypoetes
 Pseudoricia
 Sagittala
 Scotura
 Scoturopsis
 Stenoplastis
 Tithraustes
 Xenomigia
 Xenorma
 Xenormicola
 Unplaced
 ‘‘Thirmida’’ venusta

External links
Subfamily info

Notodontidae
Notodontidae of South America
Moths of South America